The Franconian Wine Queen is the annually-elected representative of the German wine region of Franconia. At the end of her time in office, she is eligible to participate in the competition for the German Wine Queen. Until 1963, the Franconian Wine Queen reigned for two years.

Selection process 
The candidates should come from a vintner's family and be at least 18 years old. The Franconian Wine Queen is chosen by a panel of judges. She represents Franconian wine for a period of twelve months, both at home and abroad. The 57th Franconian Wine Queen (2012/13) was nominated in January 2012 as Melanie Dietrich from Fahr.

After a year in office, the Franconian Wine Queen, together with the other twelve regional wine queens in Germany, takes part in the competition for the German Wine Queen. In 2008, the Franconian Wine Queen, Marlies Dumbsky from Volkach, was chosen as the 60th German Wine Queen for one year (until 2009).

Franconian Wine Queens 
(incomplete list)
 1950/1951 Tilly Lurz, Randersacker
 1951-1953 Marianne Spenkuch, Wiesenbronn
 1953-1955 Doris Bausenwein, Iphofen
 1955-1957 Hedwig Raps, Volkach
 1957      Karoline Baumgärtner, Rödelsee (German Wine Queen)
 1957-1959 Rosemarie Stolzenberger, Klingenberg am Main (German Wine Queen)
 1959-1961 Maria Brombierstäudl, Iphofen
 1961-1963 Irene Krauss, Obereisenheim
 1963/1964 Marita Bäuerlein, Volkach (Deutsche Weinkönigin)
 1964/1965 Christa Navratil, Nordheim am Main
 1965/1966 Christa Karl, Volkach
 1966/1967 Christa Boll, Escherndorf
 1967/1968 Brigitte Fleder, Veitshöchheim (German Wine Queen)

 1969/1970 Christa Horn, Iphofen
 1970/1971 Heide-Marie Greiner-Römmert, Volkach
 1971/1972 Marlene Schäffer, Thüngersheim
 1972/1973 Christl Finger, Randersacker
 1973/1974 Renate Loichinger, Großheubach
 1974/1975 Gertraud Schubert, Obereisenheim
 1975/1976 Carmen Stumpf, Frickenhausen am Main
 1976/1977 Irmtraud Zimmermann, Retzstadt 
 1977/1978 Monika Lindner, Volkach-Escherndorf
 1978/1979 Helga Sauer, Obereisenheim
 1979/1980 Barbara Schiebel, Untereisenheim
 1980/1981 Irmgard Gündert, Sommerach
 1981/1982 Anita Krämer-Gerhard, Astheim (German Wine Queen)
 1982/1983 Karin Molitor-Hartmann, Sommerach (German Wine Queen 1982/1983)
 1983/1984 Andrea Wägerle, Obereisenheim
 1984/1985 Irene Säger, Zeilitzheim 
 1985/1986 Monika Kirch, Nordheim am Main
 1986/1987 Christl Büttner, Thüngersheim
 1987/1988 Petra Ungemach, Nordheim am Main
 1988/1989 Doris Paul, Wiesenbronn
 1989/1990 Renate Schäfer, Volkach-Astheim (German Wine Queen 1989/1990)
 1990/1991 Karin Rickel, Großlangheim 
 1991/1992 Heidrun Kaufmann, Erlenbach bei Marktheidenfeld
 1992/1993 Andrea Schröder geb. Hütten, Randersacker 
 1993/1994 Victoria Hessdörfer, Retzbach 
 1994/1995 Tanja Elflein, Obereisenheim 
 1995/1996 Daniela Soth, Erlenbach bei Marktheidenfeld
 1996/1997 Claudia Schmachtenberger, Eibelstadt
 1997/1998 Martina Reiss, Ipsheim
 1998/1999 Michaela Heusinger, Sommerach 
 1999/2000 Sandra Sauer, Volkach-Escherndorf 
 2000/2001 Silvia Gaul, Stetten 
 2001/2002 Iris Stumpf, Erlenbach bei Marktheidenfeld
 2002/2003 Julia Stühler, Untereisenheim 
 2003/2004 Nicole Then, Sommerach (German Wine Queen)
 2004/2005 Lisa Schmitt, Großlangheim 
 2005/2006 Eva Steindorf, Volkach-Escherndorf 
 2006/2007 Jennifer Herbert, Zeilitzheim
 2007/2008 Eva Barthelme, Volkach-Gaibach
 2008/2009 Marlies Dumbsky, Volkach (German Wine Queen 2008/2009)
 2009/2010 Anna Saum, Großlangheim
 2010/2011 Melanie Unsleber, Ramsthal (German Wine Princess)
 2011/2012 Sabine Ziegler, Güntersleben
 2012/2013 Melanie Dietrich, Fahr
 2013/2014 Marion Wunderlich, Tauberrettersheim
 2014/2015 Christin Ungemach, Nordheim am Main
 2015/2016 Kristin Langmann, Bullenheim
 2016/2017 Christina Schneider, Nordheim am Main (German Wine Princess 2016/2017)
 2017/2018 Silena Werner, Stammheim
 2018/2019 Klara Zehnder, Randersacker
 2019/2020 Carolin Meyer, Castell-Greuth

Number of winners by place 
(incomplete list)

References

External links 
 Fränkische wird Deutsche Weinkönigin
 Weinbaugebiet Franken
 Winzergemeinschaft Franken (GWF)
 Tourismusverband Fränkisches Weinland

German wine
Franconian culture
!